Pierre Marie Mahé (1833 – 2 February 1913) was French stamp dealer who was acknowledged as one of the Fathers of Philately on the Roll of Distinguished Philatelists.

Association with Philipp von Ferrary
Mahé owned a succession of stamp shops in Paris at Rue de Clichy, Rue de Chateaudon and Rue de Cannettes. One of his customers was Philipp von Ferrary who later employed Mahé as his private secretary and custodian of his stamp collection at his mansion in Rue de Varennes from 1874 until Mahé died in 1913.

After Pierre's death, his son Édouard M. Mahé took over the work. Pierre was also survived by a daughter.

Awards
In 1907 at the Congres des Societes Savantes, Mahé was named an Officer de l'Instruction Publique.

In 1910 he received the Lindenberg Medal.

Selected publications
 Les Marchands de Timbres-Poste d'autrefois et leurs catalogues. Amiens, France: Yvert et Tellier, 1908.

References

French philatelists
French stamp dealers
Recipients of the Lindenberg Medal
1833 births
1913 deaths
Fathers of philately